Probe Ridge is a prominent, snow-free, terraced ridge forming part of the north flank of Viking Valley, situated in the southeast portion of Alexander Island, Antarctica. The ridge was named by the United Kingdom Antarctic Place-Names Committee (UK-APC) in 1993 after the space probe which surveyed the planet Mars in 1976.

See also

 Aeolus Ridge
 Leda Ridge
 Polarstar Ridge

Ridges of Alexander Island